Events from the year 1854 in Germany.

Incumbents
 King of Bavaria – Maximilian II
 King of Hanover – George V
 King of Prussia – Frederick William IV
 King of Saxony – till 9 August Frederick Augustus II and John of Saxony afterwards

Events
 15 July – The Glaspalast is opened in Munich. A giant glass building modelled on London's The Crystal Palace, it houses an industrial exhibition.

Undated
 Construction finishes on the neoclassical Semper Gallery in Dresden designed by Gottfried Semper
 Karl Wilhelm sets the words of Max Schneckenburger's poem "Die Wacht am Rhein" to music, creating a patriotic anthem
 Gustav Bläser's sculpture Athena Protects the Young Hero is installed in Berlin

Births
 17 February – Friedrich Alfred Krupp, German industrialist (died 1902)
 14 March - Paul Ehrlich, German physician, scientist (died 1915)
 15 March – Emil von Behring, German physiologist, winner of the 1901 Nobel Prize in Physiology or Medicine (died 1917)
 18 April – Ludwig Levy, German architect (died 1907)
 11 May - Ottmar Mergenthaler, German inventor of linotype (died 1899)
 23 August - Moritz Moszkowski, German/Polish composer and pianist (died 1925)
 1 September – Engelbert Humperdinck, German composer (died 1921)
 13 September - Hermann von Stein, German general (died 1927)
Date unknown
Wilhelm Walloth, writer (died 1932)

Deaths	
 1 January - Conrad Hinrich Donner, German banker and art collector (born 1774)
 25 March - Caroline of Nassau-Saarbrücken, German  Countess Palatine of Zweibrücken (born 1704)
 11 April – Karl Adolph von Basedow, German physician (born 1799)
 27 April - Hermann Abeken, German political writer (born 1820)
 18 May - Ernst von Bodelschwingh-Velmede, German statesman and politician (born 1794)
 13 June – Rosina Regina Ahles, German actor (born 1799)
 20 June - Caroline of Hesse-Homburg (born 1771)
 6 July – Georg Ohm, German physicist (born 1789)
 25 July - Johann Samuel Eduard d'Alton, German anatomist (born 1803)
 2 August – Heinrich Clauren, German writer (born 1771)
 9 August - Frederick Augustus II of Saxony, king of Saxony (born 1797)
 20 August - Friedrich Wilhelm Joseph Schelling, German philosopher (born 1775)
 18 September - Johann Friedrich Meckel, the Elder, German anatomist (born 1724)	
 26 October – Therese of Saxe-Hildburghausen, queen consort of Bavaria (born 1792)
 23 November - Gottfried Bernhard Göz, German painter (born 1708)
 13 December - Andreas Buchner, German historian (born 1776)

 
Years of the 19th century in Germany
Germany
Germany